Savith Priyan (born 14 November 1990) is a Sri Lankan cricketer. He made his first-class debut for Badureliya Sports Club in the 2016–17 Premier League Tournament on 28 December 2016. He made his List A debut for Ampara District in the 2016–17 Districts One Day Tournament on 25 March 2017. He made his Twenty20 debut for Badureliya Sports Club in the 2017–18 SLC Twenty20 Tournament on 24 February 2018.

References

External links
 

1990 births
Living people
Sri Lankan cricketers
Ampara District cricketers
Badureliya Sports Club cricketers
People from Kalutara